Keith Wainwright is an English hairdresser who was awarded an MBE in 2010.

Training

In 1959 Wainwright started a five-year apprenticeship, followed by a year on the Union Castle liners.

Work

In 1965 he began working in London's West End for Leonard ladies salon. where he was responsible for starting one of the first men's hairdressers catering for the longer men's styles of the time  and playing music to create a more youthful atmosphere. His clients at this time included Roy Wood, The Move, Cat Stevens, The Walker Brothers and Elton John.

In 1969 Wainwright opened the salon in Knightsbridge "Smile" with two partners, Leslie Russell and Paul Owen. During the next decade he worked with chemists and hair technicians to create "unnatural" hair colours. These were later popularised by the British "punk" movement. Keith at this time was known as "Keith at Smile."

Albums and films

Wainwright was the first hairdresser to be credited on an album sleeve with Roxy Music's debut album "Roxy Music."

He did the hair for Derek Jarman films, "Sebastiane," "Jubilee," and "The Tempest," where he met Toyah Willcox, whose hair he coloured and styled for the next ten years. Wainwright also consulted on Malcolm McLaren's "The Great Rock 'n' Roll Swindle."

In the 80s he styled hair for TV commercials such as Brylcreem and pop promos; for example, Cliff Richard and Debbie Harry while continuing to work at "Smile."  Smile moved to Chelsea in 1984.
Mentioned in the lyrics of The Pet Shop Boys 2012 album Elysium on the track "Requiem in Denim and Leopardskin.

In 1989 Wainwright and Leslie Russell started "Smile Management with Kim Sion. This agency began with stylists and makeup artists and soon moved to represent fashion photographers, such as Ellen Unworth, Steve Hiett,  Mert & Marcus and Mario Testino. This agency closed in 2003.

Awards

In 2010 Keith was awarded an MBE for his contribution to hairdressing.

References

Bracewell, Michael. Re-make/Re-model: Becoming Roxy Music, Faber & Faber, 2008. 

Hislop, Kirsty, & Lutyens, Dominic. 70s Style and Design, Thames & Hudson, 2009 

Fiell, Charlotte.  Hairstyles: Ancient to Present, Fiell Publishing Limited, 2012 
. 

Gorman, Paul. Mr Freedom- Tommy Roberts: British Design Hero, Adelita Ltd. 
, 

Mulvagh, Jane. Vivienne Westwood, HarperCollins, 1998.

Credits, Albums

Roxy Music, debut album
Bryan Ferry, These Foolish Things
Pet Shop Boys, Elysium
Madness, One Step Beyond

Vogue: https://web.archive.org/web/20120323123606/http://www.smilesalon.co.uk/pressp1.htm

Evening News April 29, 1969

Evening Standard  May 11, 1970

British hairdressers
Members of the Order of the British Empire
Living people
Year of birth missing (living people)